Pierre Clavé (12 July 1887 – 16 July 1974) was a French cavalry officer and equestrian. He competed at the 1924 Summer Olympics and the 1928 Summer Olympics.

References

External links
 

1887 births
1974 deaths
French male equestrians
Olympic equestrians of France
Equestrians at the 1924 Summer Olympics
Equestrians at the 1928 Summer Olympics
Sportspeople from Landes (department)